Ağasıbəyli may refer to the following places in Azerbaijan:

Aşağı Ağasıbəyli
Yuxarı Ağasıbəyli
Agasibeyli